Saint Lucian passports are issued to citizens of Saint Lucia for international travel.   Saint Lucian citizens had visa-free or visa on arrival access (including eTAs) to 147 countries and territories, ranking the Saint Lucian passport 32nd in the world in terms of travel freedom according to the Henley Passport Index.

See also
 Caribbean passport
 Visa requirements for Saint Lucian citizens
Visa policy of Saint Lucia

References

 https://web.archive.org/web/20110614061747/http://www.stlucia.gov.lc/pr2007/january/saint_lucians_warned_on_passport_misuse_as_new_issuing_system_gets_underway.htm
 https://web.archive.org/web/20090105204517/http://www.pm.gov.lc/former_prime_ministers/kenny_d_anthony/statements/2003/prime_minister_address_the_nation_on_national_security_march_6_2003.htm

Passports by country
Government of Saint Lucia